Marconi (formerly called Fisherman's) is an unincorporated community in Marin County, California. Marconi is located in the area of the town of Marshall, California.

The inhabitants of an old Native American settlement called "Fisherman's" later shipped seafood from here via railroad. Then, in 1913, the Marconi Wireless Company bought this site to establish a transpacific wireless telegraph station.

See also
 Marconi Conference Center
 Wireless telegraphy

References

Unincorporated communities in California
Unincorporated communities in Marin County, California
Populated coastal places in California